The 1929 Kentucky Derby was the 55th running of the Kentucky Derby. The race was run on May 18, 1929.

Payout
The Kentucky Derby Payout Schedule

Field

Winning Breeder: Herbert P. Gardner; (KY)

Margins – 2 lengths
Time – 2:10 4/5
Track – Muddy

References

Kentucky Derby races
Derby
Kentucky Derby